Leonardo di Piero Dati (1360 – 16 March 1425) was an Italian friar and humanist. He was Master General of the Dominican Order from 1414 to his death.

He was a Prior of Santa Maria Novella from 1401, and took part in the Council of Pisa of 1409. Dati was the head of the Dominicans belonging to the Roman obedience during the Great Schism. At the time of the Council of Constance, Dati became Master General of a reunited Dominican Order. Dati then focused on the internal reform of the order, authoring the tract Lamentationes de regularibus observantiis lapsis, in which he expressed strong dissatisfaction with the laxity and confusion of the order. His sermons at Pisa and Constance include references to literary texts, and he was well known as an author of commentaries on Aristotle. Leonardo also gave financial aid to his brother Gregorio, a Florentine merchant and diarist.

Both Leonardo and Gregorio Dati are attributed authorship of La Sfera ("The Sphere"), an astronomical-geographic poemetto in ottave, written in the second half of the 14th century, and a work much popular in its time. This work in verse gives information about the world, the marinaresche compass and other things, adding observations, notes about travel and designs. In some manuscripts of La Sfera there are designs representing ports, headlands, islands, linked by many lines.

Dati's sermons on the feast of St. Francis (October 1416) and the feast of the Circumcision of Jesus (January 1417) advocated respect for papal power and reform within the context of the established order. The earlier sermon touched off an exchange of polemical memoranda between Dati and supporters of conciliar supremacy. Dati then addressed issues raised in this exchange in the later sermon. Dati's discussion of circumcision was traditional for his time, describing the Jewish rite as superseded by baptism.

He is buried in the Cappella Rucellai at Santa Maria Novella. His tombstone is attributed to Lorenzo Ghiberti.

Works

 La Sfera
 Trophaeum Anglaricum

Sources
 Hillenbrand, Eugen. "Die Observantenbewegung in der deutschen Ordensprovinz der Dominikaner," in Elm, Kaspar, ed. Reformbemühungen und Observanzbestrebungen im spätmittelalterlichen Ordenswesen.  Berliner Historische Studien, 14, Ordensstudien 6. Berlin, Duncker and Humblot, 1989: 232–233.

References

External links
 The manuscript of La Sphera, digital copy of the manuscript in the collections of The National Library of Finland
 The text and commentary of Trophaeum Anglaricum (in German)

1360 births
1425 deaths
Italian Dominicans
Italian Renaissance humanists
Masters of the Order of Preachers